The 1972–73 season was the 62nd season in Hajduk Split’s history and their 27th season in the Yugoslav First League. Their 10th place finish in the 1971–72 season meant it was their 27th successive season playing in the Yugoslav First League.

Competitions

Overall

Yugoslav First League

Classification

Results summary

Results by round

Matches

First League

Source: hajduk.hr

Cup Winners' Cup

Sources: hajduk.hr

Player seasonal records

Top scorers

Source: Competitive matches

See also
1972–73 Yugoslav First League

External sources
 1972–73 Yugoslav First League at rsssf.com
 1972–73 European Cup Winners' Cup at rsssf.com

HNK Hajduk Split seasons
Hajduk Split